Marc Pinsach Rubirola  (born 15 April 1989) is a Catalan ski mountaineer.

Pinsach is born in Girona. He started ski mountaineering in 2000 and has been member of the Spanish national team since 2006. He lives in Cassà de la Selva.

Selected results 
 2010:
 4th, World Championship relay race, together with Javier Martín de Villa, Kílian Jornet Burgada and Manuel Pérez Brunicardi
 7th, World Championship vertical race
 8th, World Championship team race, together with Kílian Jornet Burgada
 9th, World Championship single race
 7th, World Championship combination ranking
 1st (espoirs), Trophée des Gastlosen (ISMF World Cup), together with Kílian Jornet Burgada
 2011:
 4th, World Championship relay, together with Kílian Jornet Burgada, Miguel Caballero Ortega and  Javier Martín de Villa
 6th, World Championship vertical race
 8th, World Championship team race (together with Kílian Jornet Burgada)
 10th, World Championship single race
 10th, World Championship vertical, combined ranking
 2012:
 4th, European Championship relay, together with Marc Solà Pastoret, Miguel Caballero Ortega and Kílian Jornet Burgada
 5th, European Championship team, together with Kílian Jornet Burgada
 8th, European Championship vertical race
 10th, World Championship vertical, combined ranking

Patrouille des Glaciers 

 2010: 4th, together with Kílian Jornet Burgada and Marc Solà Pastoret

Pierra Menta 

 2010: 8th, together with Javier Martín de Villa
 2011: 8th, together with Pietro Lanfranchi
 2012: 7th, together with Kílian Jornet Burgada

Trofeo Mezzalama 

 2011: 3rd, together with Michele Boscacci and Robert Antonioli

External links 
 Marc Pinsach Rubirola at Skimountaineering.org

References 

1989 births
Living people
Spanish male ski mountaineers
Sportspeople from Girona
Ski mountaineers from Catalonia